The 2015 Italian presidential election was held on 29–31 January, following the resignation of President Giorgio Napolitano on 14 January 2015. The office was held at the time of the election by Senate President Pietro Grasso in an acting capacity. Only members of Italian Parliament and regional delegates are entitled to vote. As head of state of the Italian Republic, the President has a role of representation of national unity and guarantees that Italian politics comply with the Italian Constitution, in the framework of a parliamentary system.

On 31 January, at the fourth round of voting, the Judge of the Constitutional Court and former Deputy Prime Minister Sergio Mattarella was elected President of the Italian Republic with 665 votes out of 1,009.

Procedure 
In accordance with the Italian Constitution, the election is held in the form of a secret ballot, with the Senators, the Deputies and 58 regional representatives entitled to vote. The election is held in the Palazzo Montecitorio, home of the Chamber of Deputies, with the capacity of the assembly room expanded for the purpose. The first three ballots require a two-thirds majority of the 1,009 voters in order to elect a President, or 673 votes. Starting from the fourth ballot, an absolute majority is required for candidates to be elected, or 505 votes. The presidential mandate lasts seven years.

The election was presided over by the President of the Chamber of Deputies Laura Boldrini, who proceeded to the public counting of the votes, and by the Acting President of the Senate Valeria Fedeli, instead of President Pietro Grasso who was serving as Acting President of the Republic since 14 January.

Electoral college 
Electors per parliamentary group (including the regional delegates) were divided as follows:

Proposed candidates 
These candidates were officially proposed as president and voted in at least one ballot, by parties, coalitions or parliamentary groups which took part in the election.

Elected president

Other candidates

Results

First ballot (29 January)

Second ballot (30 January)

Third ballot (30 January)

Fourth ballot (31 January)

See also 
2015 Five Star Movement presidential primary election

References 

Presidential elections in Italy
2015 elections in Italy
Presidential